Michael Andrew Murphy (born 29 November 1973 in Brisbane, Queensland) is a former Olympic diver for Australia. He was an Australian Institute of Sport scholarship holder. Murphy competed twice at the Olympic Games (in 1992 and 1996), placing 4th in the 3-metre springboard event at the 1992 Games in Barcelona.

Murphy also represented Australia twice at the Commonwealth Games (in 1990 and 1994), winning two gold medals and one silver medal at the 1994 Games in Victoria (Canada). After retiring from competitive diving, Murphy served as both a Board Member and National Team Selector for Diving Australia. In recognition of his contribution to the sporting community, he was awarded the Australian Sports Medal (an Australian federal government honour) in 2000.

Murphy completed his undergraduate studies at Bond University, where he gained a Bachelor of Commerce (BCom) and a Bachelor of Laws with Honours (LLB (Hons)). He was winner of both the Sir Robert Gordon Menzies Scholarship to Harvard, and the Macquarie Bank Graduate Management Scholarship.  He holds a Master of Business Administration (MBA) from Harvard Business School. He is currently a managing director with Bain Capital, and was previously a management consultant with Bain & Company.

References

External links
 

Living people
1973 births
Divers at the 1990 Commonwealth Games
Divers at the 1992 Summer Olympics
Divers at the 1994 Commonwealth Games
Divers at the 1996 Summer Olympics
Olympic divers of Australia
Bond University alumni
Harvard Business School alumni
Australian Institute of Sport divers
Commonwealth Games gold medallists for Australia
Sportspeople from Brisbane
Australian male divers
Commonwealth Games silver medallists for Australia
Commonwealth Games medallists in diving
Medallists at the 1994 Commonwealth Games